Linzer Athletik-Sport-Klub, commonly known as Linzer ASK or simply LASK, is an Austrian professional football club, from the Upper-Austrian state capital Linz. It is the oldest football club in that region, and plays in the Austrian Football Bundesliga, the top tier of Austrian football. The club's colours are black and white. The women's team plays in the second highest division of Austrian women's football.

LASK was founded on 7 August 1908. In 1965, the club became the first team outside Vienna to win the Austrian football championship. This is also its only championship to date. The club currently plays its league fixtures at the Waldstadion in Pasching, but at the 14,000 capacity Linzer Stadion in UEFA competitions.

History 

In the winter of 1908, Albert Siems, head of the royal post-office garage at Linz, who had already been a member of an 1899-founded club for heavy athletics, Linzer Athletik Sportklub Siegfried, decided to establish a football club. At that time, the side already played in the black-and-white lengthwise-touched shirts.

The club's first name was Linzer Sportclub. During an extraordinary general meeting on 14 September 1919, the final change of name, to Linzer Athletik Sport-Klub (short form Linzer ASK) took place, its forerunner setting the example. Nevertheless, the public denomination of the team was largely LASK. The club first appeared in top-flight competition in the Gauliga Ostmark in 1940–41, coming last and being relegated.

LASK achieved its greatest success, in winning the Austrian League in 1965. No club outside Vienna had ever won before. Additionally, the club won the domestic cup that same year.

In 1985–86's UEFA Cup, the side beat European giants Internazionale Milan at home (1–0), on 23 October 1985, eventually bowing out 4–1 on aggregate (second round).

In 1995, the official name became LASK Linz, as officials wanted to bring out the city's name as a complement to the LASK designation, which had constituted itself as a brand name. It is one of the few clubs of the country's higher divisions that, since coming in existence, never exhibited a sponsor in the official club name.

In 1996, Werder Bremen was beaten away in the UI Cup.

In 1997, due to public pressure, LASK Linz officially merged with city rivals FC Linz (formerly known as SK VOEST Linz). The club name, colours, chairmen and members remained the same.

At the end of the 90s the club had great ambitions. However, the bank of the president slipped into insolvency and therefore the club also faced big financial problems. The president fled to the Côte d'Azur with a lot of cash and the club was on the verge of bankruptcy with several large debts. The club sold its training facilities and the best players. The result was a relegation to the Second Division (2. Liga) but also financial consolidation.

In 2007, after a long time in the second division, they were promoted to the highest division again. They were title contenders until ten rounds before the end, but, due to a dispute about the extension of the coach's contract, they only finished 5th.

Relegation to the 3. Liga in 2012 was accompanied by imminent bankruptcy. The club was taken over by a consortium of local entrepreneurs called "Friends of LASK" in December 2013. By this time the club was on the verge of being shut down. The players received no salary. They could not afford the city stadium, so they moved to a stadium 50 km away. It was only because of the tremendous cohesion of the coach and the team that the club was able to keep the championship going at that time.

After promotion to the 2. Liga, which was celebrated in front of 13,000 fans in the Linzer Stadion, the club was promoted to the highest division again in the third year after the takeover. During this time the coach Oliver Glasner built up a new team with Vice President Jürgen Werner with an unmistakable style of play.

In 2016, the club moved to Pasching after disagreements with the city council. In 2018, the club returned to the European competitions, but they were eliminated in qualifying for the Europa league after a 2–1 win in the second leg due to the away goals rule against Beşiktaş. In the 2019–20 UEFA Europa League, LASK reached the round of 16, where they were eliminated by Manchester United.

They are due to return to a new stadium built at the site of the Linzer Stadion in 2023.

LASK officially opened new stadium on 24 February 2023 against SC Austria Lustenau in Raiffeisen Arena.

Logo 

In 2017, the club removed the "Linz" part of their name, and returned it to LASK. The merger with FC Linz has long fallen apart, and the club have now removed "Linz" from the name.

Players

Current squad

Out on loan

Club Officials

Coach history 

  Georg Braun (1946–1952)
  Walter Alt (1950–1953)
  Ernst Sabeditsch (1953–1955)
  Josef Epp (1958–1960)
  Pál Csernai (1960–1962)
  Karl Schlechta (1962–1964)
  František Bufka (1965–1968)
  Vojtech Skyva (1969–1970)
  Wilhelm Kment (1970–1972)
  Otto Barić (1972–1974)
  Felix Latzke (1974–1976)
  Wilhelm Huberts (1976–1978)
  Wolfgang Gayer (1978)
  Laszlo Simko (1978)
  Adolf Blutsch (1978–1983)
  Johann Kondert (1983–1987)
  Adolf Blutsch (1987)
  Ernst Hložek (1987–1988)
  Ernst Knorrek (1988)
  Lothar Buchmann (1989)
  Adam Kensy (1989)
   Aleksander Mandziara (1989–1990)
  Erwin Spiegel (1990)
  Adolf Blutsch (1990)
  Ernst Weber (1990)
  Erwin Spiegel (1990–91)
  Helmut Senekowitsch (1991–1993)
  Dietmar Constantini (1993)
  Walter Skocik (1993–1995)
  Günter Kronsteiner (1995–1996)
  Max Hagmayr (1996)
  Friedel Rausch (1996–1997)
  Per Brogeland (1997–1998)
  Adam Kensy (1998, caretaker)
  Otto Barić (1998–1999)
  Marinko Koljanin (1999–2000)
  Johann Kondert (2000–2001)
  František Cipro (2001)
  Johann Kondert (2001)
  Dieter Mirnegg (2001–2002)
  Norbert Barisits (2003–2004)
  Klaus Lindenberger (2004)
  Werner Gregoritsch (2004–2006)
  Karl Daxbacher (2006–2008)
  Andrej Panadić (2008)
  Klaus Lindenberger (2008–2009)
  Hans Krankl (2009)
  Matthias Hamann (2009–2010)
  Helmut Kraft (2010)
  Georg Zellhofer (2010–2011)
  Walter Schachner (2011–2012)
  Karl Daxbacher (2012–2015)
  Martin Hiden (2015)
  Alfred Olzinger (2015)
  Oliver Glasner (2015–2019)
   Valérien Ismaël (2019–2020)
  Dominik Thalhammer (2020–2021)
  Andreas Wieland (2021–2022)
  Dietmar Kühbauer (2022–present)

Honours

League 
Austrian League
Winners (1): 1964–65
Runners-up: 1961–62, 2018–19
Austrian Second Division
Winners (5): 1957–58, 1978–79, 1993–94, 2006–07, 2016–17

Cups 
Austrian Cup
Winners (1): 1964–65
Runners-up: 1962–63, 1966–67, 1969–70, 1998–99, 2020–21

European competition history

References

External links 

  
UEFA.com club profile
EUFO.de club profile
Weltfussball.de club profile 
Squad at FootballSquads
NationalFootballTeams data
LASK Linz at Football-Lineups.com
Unofficial weblog about LASK 

 
Association football clubs established in 1908
Football clubs in Austria
Football clubs from former German territories
1908 establishments in Austria